Kabula Barabula is a 2017 Indian Odia film directed by Ramesh Rout. The film stars Anubhav Mohanty and Elina Samantray in the lead roles. The film was released on September 27, 2017. The movie is a remake of 2013 Punjabi movie Singh vs Kaur.

Plot

The story is based on a village Odia man who is going to Malaysia to search for his Laila, the daughter of a rich father. Finding her proves difficult.

Cast
 Anubhav Mohanty as Kabula
 Elina Samantray as Saloni
 Papu Pom Pom as Sweety
 Abhisek Bhatta 
 Harihar Mohapatra 
Pradyumna Lenka as Village head
 Anisha
 Mantu
 Prince
 Anita Das
 Sambhu
 Devansh Maheshwar
 Banku Bala

Production
The movie was developed under banner Amara Muzik, including more five Odia films in the next two years.

Release
'Kabula Barabula' was released on September 27, 2017, on the occasion of Durga Puja.

Box office 
It became a hit at the box office.

Soundtrack

Music of this film was composed by Prem Anand. The complete soundtrack of this album was released on 27 September 2017.

References

2017 films
Indian romantic comedy films
Odia remakes of Punjabi films
2010s Odia-language films
2017 romantic comedy films